"Back That Thang Up" (or the uncensored version "Back That Azz Up") is a song recorded by American rapper Juvenile featuring fellow American rappers Mannie Fresh and Lil Wayne. Produced by Fresh, it was released on June 11, 1999, as the second single from Juvenile's 1998 album 400 Degreez. The song was Juvenile's biggest hit single at the time until the chart-topping "Slow Motion" in 2004, surpassing "Back That Azz Up" which peaked at number 19 on the Billboard Hot 100. In 2021, it was listed at number 478 on Rolling Stone's "Top 500 Best Songs of All Time".

Wayne's lyrics ("After you back it up and then stop/then what, what/ drop, drop, drop it like it's hot.") popularized an expression for a certain type of sexually suggestive dance. Five years later, the expression was re-popularized by Snoop Dogg with his number-one hit "Drop It Like It's Hot". Lil Wayne's verse was repeated on his 2008 single "Lollipop". Canadian rapper Drake samples the song for his song "Practice" from his 2011 album Take Care. R&B singer Jonn Hart did a remake of the song.

Both the song and its music video were omnipresent in media venues for much of 1999 and early 2000. "Back That Thang Up",  Lil Wayne's "Tha Block Is Hot", and B.G.'s  "Bling Bling" were the three hits that launched Cash Money into the pop mainstream.

Based on the content of the song, there were three edited versions of the song, which allowed for radio stations to choose between playing "Back That Thang Up" and the edited version of "Back That Azz Up". Johnny Kenaya was in the studio with Juvenile and Mannie Fresh while the record was playing. He gave the green light on the project to go on. The former had redone amended lyrics, while the latter was edited as is (with the word "ass" left intact). Also, the edited album version had "ass" backmasked along with other expletives. "Back That Thang Up" only came out on the single, the compilation Universal Smash Hits in 2000, and Juvenile's Greatest Hits in 2004.

Live performances 
In February 2020, Juvenile performed "Back That Azz Up" with billionaire businessman Tom Steyer at Allen University in Columbia, South Carolina during Steyer's Democratic Party presidential primary campaign. While Juvenile performed the lyrics, Steyer danced onstage alongside his wife and daughter before delivering a speech targeted to youth and minority voters. Steyer withdrew from the presidential race the day after the performance in part due to a weak showing in that state's primary.

Court ruling 
In Positive Black Talk, Inc. v. Cash Money Records, Inc. (2004), the United States Court of Appeals for the Fifth Circuit concluded that the song did not infringe the copyright of DJ Jubilee's song "Back That Ass Up".

Remix 

In 2021, Juvenile released “Vaxx That Thang Up”, a remix whose lyrics encouraged vaccination for COVID-19. The song, also featuring Mannie Fresh and Mia X, was sponsored by Match Group's dating app BLK. "Vaxx That Thang Up" was released to mixed reactions. Juvenile responded to critics by claiming that his goal was not to force listeners to receive the vaccine, but instead that they "get educated on it, and make the right decision.”

In popular culture 
The clean version of the song was first featured in the 2001 animated/live action hybrid film Osmosis Jones.
The uncensored version of the song was featured in Ellen DeGeneres' Netflix stand-up comedy special Relatable  and the 2023 film remake of House Party.

Charts

Weekly charts

Year-end charts

Certifications

References 

1998 songs
1999 singles
Juvenile (rapper) songs
Lil Wayne songs
Mannie Fresh songs
Songs written by Juvenile (rapper)
Songs written by Lil Wayne
Songs written by Mannie Fresh
Dirty rap songs
Cash Money Records singles
Universal Records singles